Tamara Bach (born January 18, 1976 in Limburg an der Lahn, Hesse) is a German writer.

Life
Tamara Bach was born in Limburg an der Lahn in 1976 and grew up in Ludwigshöhe, Rhineland-Palatinate. She was encouraged in her writing by her then German teacher, Peter Grosz. In 1993 and 1995 she took part in the prestigious meeting of young writers, where she earned an award. After finishing school in 1995, she went to Derry, Northern Ireland as an au pair. She began as a student in Mainz in 1996, but after three semesters she moved to Berlin. She has lived there since 1997, studying German and English at the Free University and completing her studies in early 2006. In addition to her studies, she worked for television and has developed youth plays.

Her first book was Girl from Mars, published in Germany in 2003. It won several awards, including the Luchs prize for September, 2003, and the German youth literature prize for the best youth book in 2004. She followed this with Busfahrt mit Kuhn in 2004, and Jetzt ist hier in 2007, which won the Luchs prize for 2007.

Works
Marsmädchen: Roman, Deutscher Taschenbuch-Verlag, 2005, 
Translator Shelley Tanaka, Girl from Mars, Toronto: Groundwood Books, 2009, 
Fran en annan planet: Roman, Bergh, 2005, 
Busfahrt mit Kuhn, F. Oetinger, 2004, ; DTV Deutscher Taschenbuch, 2007,  
Translator Solveig Rasmussen En tid för allting, Bergh, 2006, 
Jetzt ist hier, Oetinger Friedrich GmbH, 2007,

References

External links
 
 Ralf Schweikart: Der Mars ist so nah. Die Jugendbuchautorin Tamara Bach

1976 births
Living people
People from Limburg an der Lahn
German women writers